The 2004 Challenge Cup, known as the Powergen Challenge Cup for sponsorship reasons, was the 103rd staging of the Challenge Cup, a European rugby league cup competition.

The competition began in November 2003, and ended with the final in May 2004, which was played at the Millennium Stadium in Cardiff due to ongoing reconstruction work at Wembley Stadium.

The tournament was won by St. Helens, who beat Wigan Warriors 32–16 in the final. The Lance Todd Trophy was won by Sean Long.

First round

Second round

Third round

Fourth round

Fifth round

Quarter-finals

Semi-finals

Final

Teams:

St Helens: Paul Wellens, Ade Gardner, Martin Gleeson, Willie Talau, Darren Albert; Jason Hooper, Sean Long, Nick Fozzard, Keiron Cunningham, Keith Mason, Chris Joynt, Lee Gilmour, Paul Sculthorpe (c)
Subs: Dominic Fe'aunati, Jon Wilkin, Ricky Bibey, Mark Edmondson Coach: Ian Millward

Wigan: Kris Radlinski, David Hodgson, Sean O'Loughlin, Kevin Brown, Brett Dallas, Danny Orr, Adrian Lam, Quentin Pongia, Terry Newton, Craig Smith, Danny Tickle, Gareth Hock, Andy Farrell (c)
Subs: Stephen Wild, Mick Cassidy, Danny Sculthorpe, Terry O'Connor  Coach: Mike Gregory

References

External links
Challenge Cup official website

St Helens R.F.C.
Challenge Cup
Challenge Cup
Challenge Cup